

Events

Pre-1600
1170 – Thomas Becket, Archbishop of Canterbury, is assassinated inside Canterbury Cathedral by followers of King Henry II; he subsequently becomes a saint and martyr in the Anglican Communion and the Catholic Church.
1503 – The Battle of Garigliano was fought between a Spanish army under Gonzalo Fernández de Córdoba and a French army commanded by Ludovico II, Marquess of Saluzzo.

1601–1900
1607 – According to John Smith, Pocahontas, daughter of Powhatan leader Wahunsenacawh, successfully pleads for his life after tribal leaders attempt to execute him. 
1778 – American Revolutionary War: Three thousand British soldiers under the command of Lieutenant Colonel Archibald Campbell capture Savannah, Georgia.
1835 – The Treaty of New Echota is signed, ceding all the lands of the Cherokee east of the Mississippi River to the United States.
1845 – The United States annexes the Republic of Texas and admits it as the 28th state. 
1874 – The military coup of Gen. Martinez Campos in Sagunto ends the failed First Spanish Republic and the monarchy is restored as Prince Alfonso is proclaimed King of Spain.
1876 – The Ashtabula River railroad disaster occurs, leaving 64 injured and 92 dead at Ashtabula, Ohio.
1890 – On Pine Ridge Indian Reservation, 300 Lakota are killed by the United States 7th Cavalry Regiment.

1901–present
1911 – Mongolia gains independence from the Qing dynasty, enthroning 8th Jebtsundamba Khutughtu as Khagan of Mongolia.
1913 – Cecil B. DeMille starts filming Hollywood's first feature film, The Squaw Man.
1930 – Sir Muhammad Iqbal's presidential address in Allahabad introduces the two-nation theory and outlines a vision for the creation of Pakistan.
1934 – Japan renounces the Washington Naval Treaty of 1922 and the London Naval Treaty of 1930.
1937 – The Irish Free State is replaced by a new state called Ireland with the adoption of a new constitution.
1940 – In the Second Great Fire of London, the Luftwaffe fire-bombs London, England, killing almost 200 civilians during World War II.
1972 – Eastern Air Lines Flight 401 (a Lockheed L-1011 TriStar) crashes in the Florida Everglades on approach to Miami International Airport, Florida, killing 101 of the 176 people on board.
1975 – A bomb explodes at LaGuardia Airport in New York City, killing 11 people and injuring more than 75.
1989 – Czech writer, philosopher and dissident Václav Havel is elected the first post-communist President of Czechoslovakia.
  1989   – The Nikkei 225 for the Tokyo Stock Exchange hits its all-time intra-day high of 38,957.44 and closing high at 38,915.87, serving as the apex of the Japanese asset price bubble.
1992 – Fernando Collor de Mello, president of Brazil, tries to resign amidst corruption charges, but is then impeached.
1994 – Turkish Airlines Flight 278 (a Boeing 737-400) crashes on approach to Van Ferit Melen Airport in Van, Turkey, killing 57 of the 76 people on board.
1996 – Guatemala and leaders of Guatemalan National Revolutionary Unity sign a peace accord ending a 36-year civil war.
1998 – Leaders of the Khmer Rouge apologize for the Cambodian genocide that claimed over one million lives.
2003 – The last known speaker of Akkala Sami dies, rendering the language extinct.
2006 – The UK settles its Anglo-American loan, post-WWII loan debt.
2012 – A Tupolev Tu-204 airliner crashes in a ditch between the airport fence and the M3 highway after overshooting a runway at Vnukovo International Airport in Moscow, Russia, killing five people and leaving three others critically injured.
2013 – A suicide bomb attack at the Volgograd-1 railway station in the southern Russian city of Volgograd kills at least 18 people and wounds 40 others.
  2013   – Seven-time Formula One champion Michael Schumacher suffers a massive head injury while skiing in the French Alps.
2020 – A large explosion at the airport in the southern Yemeni city of Aden kills at least 22 people and wounds 50.
  2020   – A magnitude 6.4 earthquake hits near the town of Petrinja in Sisak-Moslavina County, Croatia, killing 7 people.

Births

Pre-1600
1536 – Henry VI, German nobleman (d. 1572)
1550 – García de Silva Figueroa, Spanish diplomat and traveller (d. 1624)

1601–1900
1633 – Johannes Zollikofer, Swiss vicar (d. 1692)
1721 – Madame de Pompadour, mistress of King Louis XV (d. 1764)
1746 – Saverio Cassar, Maltese priest and rebel leader (d. 1805)
1766 – Charles Macintosh, Scottish chemist and the inventor of waterproof fabric (d. 1843)
1788 – Christian Jürgensen Thomsen, Danish antiquarian (d. 1865)
1796 – Johann Christian Poggendorff, German physicist and journalist (d. 1877)
1800 – Charles Goodyear, American chemist and engineer (d. 1860)
1804 – John Langdon Sibley, American librarian (d. 1885)
1808 – Andrew Johnson, American general and politician, 17th President of the United States (d. 1875)
1809 – William Ewart Gladstone, English lawyer and politician, Prime Minister of the United Kingdom (d. 1898)
1811 – Francisco Palau, Catalan Discalced Carmelite friar and priest (d. 1872)
1816 – Carl Ludwig, German physician and physiologist (d. 1895)
1844 – Womesh Chunder Bonnerjee, Indian barrister and first president of Indian National Congress (d. 1906)
1855 – August Kitzberg, Estonian author and poet (d. 1927)
1856 – Thomas Joannes Stieltjes, Dutch-French mathematician and academic (d. 1894)
1857 – Sydney Young, English chemist (d. 1937)
1859 – Venustiano Carranza, Mexican soldier and politician, 37th President of Mexico (d. 1920)
1870 – Earl Gregg Swem, American historian, bibliographer and librarian (d. 1965)
1876 – Pablo Casals, Catalan cellist and conductor (d. 1973)
  1876   – Lionel Tertis, English violist (d. 1975)
1879 – Billy Mitchell, American general and pilot (d. 1936)
1881 – Jess Willard, American boxer (d. 1968)
1886 – Georg Hermann Struve, German astronomer (d. 1933)
1894 – J. Lister Hill, American politician (d. 1984)
1896 – David Alfaro Siqueiros, Mexican painter (d. 1974)

1901–present
1903 – Candido Portinari, Brazilian painter (d. 1962)
1904 – Kuvempu, Indian author and poet (d. 1994)
1908 – Helmut Gollwitzer, German theologian and author (d. 1993)
  1908   – Magnus Pyke, English scientist and author (d. 1992)
1910 – Ronald Coase, English-American economist, author, and academic, Nobel Prize laureate  (d. 2013)
1911 – Klaus Fuchs, German physicist and spy (d. 1988)
1914 – Zainul Abedin, Bangladeshi painter and academic (d. 1976)
  1914   – Billy Tipton, American pianist and saxophonist (d. 1989)
  1914   – Albert Tucker, Australian painter and illustrator (d. 1999)
1915 – Robert Ruark, American hunter and author (d. 1965)
  1915   – Jo Van Fleet, American actress (d. 1996)
1917 – Tom Bradley, American lieutenant, lawyer, and politician, 38th Mayor of Los Angeles (d. 1998)
  1917   – Ramanand Sagar, Indian director and producer (d. 2005)
1919 – Alfred de Grazia, American political scientist and author (d. 2014)
  1919   – Roman Vlad, Italian pianist and composer (d. 2013)
1920 – Viveca Lindfors, Swedish-American actress, singer and poet (d. 1995)
1921 – Dobrica Ćosić, Serbian politician, 1st President of the Federal Republic of Yugoslavia (d. 2014)
  1921   – Michael Horne, English structural engineer, scientist and academic (d. 2000)
1922 – Little Joe Cook, American singer-songwriter (d. 2014)
  1922   – William Gaddis, American author and academic (d. 1998)
1923 – Cheikh Anta Diop, Senegalese historian, anthropologist, and physicist (d. 1986)
  1923   – Morton Estrin, American pianist and educator (d. 2017)
  1923   – Dina Merrill, American actress, game show panelist, socialite, heiress, and businesswoman (d. 2017)
  1923   – Shlomo Venezia, Greek-Italian author and Holocaust survivor (d. 2012)
1924 – Joe Allbritton, American businessman and publisher, founded the Allbritton Communications Company (d. 2012)
  1924   – Kim Song-ae, Korean politician (d. 2014)
1925 – Pete Dye, American golfer and architect (d. 2020)
1929 – Bernard Cribbins, British actor (d. 2022)
1932 – Inga Swenson, American actress and singer
1933 – Samuel Brittan, English journalist and author (d. 2020)
1934 – Ed Flanders, American actor (d. 1995)
1936 – Mary Tyler Moore, American actress and producer (d. 2017)
  1936   – Ray Nitschke, American football player (d. 1998)
1937 – Wayne Huizenga, American businessman, founded AutoNation (d. 2018)
1938 – Jon Voight, American actor and producer
1939 – Ed Bruce, American country music singer-songwriter (d. 2021)
1941 – Ray Thomas, English singer-songwriter and flute player (d. 2018)
1942 – Rajesh Khanna, Indian actor  (d. 2012)
1943 – Bill Aucoin, American talent manager (d. 2010)
  1943   – Molly Bang, American author and illustrator
  1943   – Rick Danko, Canadian singer-songwriter, bass player, and producer (d. 1999)
1944 – Gerard Windsor, Australian author and literary critic
1945 – Keith Milow, British artist
1946 – Marianne Faithfull, English singer-songwriter and actress
  1946   – Paul Trible, American attorney, politician and academic administrator
1947 – Richard Crandall, American physicist and computer scientist (d. 2012)
  1947   – Ted Danson, American actor and producer
  1947   – Leonhard Lapin, Estonian architect and poet
  1947   – Cozy Powell, English drummer, songwriter, and producer (d. 1998)
  1947   – Vincent Winter, Scottish actor, director, and production manager (d. 1998)
1948 – Jacky Clark Chisholm, American gospel singer
  1948   – Peter Robinson, Northern Irish politician, 3rd First Minister of Northern Ireland
1949 – David Topliss, English rugby league player and coach (d. 2008)
1950 – Jon Polito, American actor (d. 2016)
1951 – Willem de Blécourt, Dutch historical anthropologist
1952 – Gelsey Kirkland, American ballerina and choreographer
1953 – Alan Rusbridger, Zambian-English journalist and academic
  1953   – Stanley Williams, American gang leader, co-founded the Crips (d. 2005)
1955 – Chris Goodall, English businessman and author
  1955   – Donald D. Hoffman, American quantitative psychologist and author
1956 – Zaki Chehab, Lebanese-British journalist
  1956   – Katy Munger, American writer
1957 – Brad Grey, American screenwriter and producer (d. 2017)
  1957   – Paul Rudnick, American author, playwright, and screenwriter
1958 – Tyrone Benskin, English-Canadian actor, theatre director and politician
  1958   – Nancy J. Currie-Gregg, American colonel, engineer, and astronaut
1959 – Patricia Clarkson, American actress
  1959   – Ann Demeulemeester, Belgian fashion designer
  1959   – Paula Poundstone, American comedian and author
1960 – Brian A. Hopkins, American author
  1960   – Thomas Lubanga Dyilo, Congolese militia leader, founded the Union of Congolese Patriots
  1960   – Michael James Pappas, American politician
1961 – Kevin Granata, American engineer and academic (d. 2007)
1962 – Leza Lowitz, American author
  1962   – Carles Puigdemont, Catalan politician and journalist, former president
1963 – Sean Payton, American football player and coach
1964 – Michael Cudlitz, American actor
1965 – John Newton, American actor
1966 – Christian Kracht, Swiss author
1967 – Lilly Wachowski, American director, screenwriter and producer
1968 – James Mouton, American baseball player
1969 – Jason Cook, English footballer
  1969   – Jennifer Ehle, American actress
  1969   – Scott Patterson, American financial journalist and author
1970 – Kevin Weisman, American actor
1971 – Mike Pesca, American radio journalist and podcaster
1972 – Jude Law, English actor
1973 – Theo Epstein, American businessman
  1973   – Jenny Lawson, American journalist and author
1974 – Twinkle Khanna, Indian actress and writer
  1974   – Mahal, Filipino actress, comedian and vlogger (d. 2021)
  1974   – Mekhi Phifer, American actor
  1974   – Ryan Shore, Canadian composer and producer
1975 – Shawn Hatosy, American actor
1976 – Danny McBride, American actor, producer and screenwriter
1978 – Kieron Dyer, English footballer and coach
  1978   – Danny Higginbotham, English footballer and journalist
1979 – Diego Luna, Mexican actor, director and producer
  1979   – Reihan Salam, American political commentator, columnist and author
1981 – Shizuka Arakawa, Japanese figure skater and sportscaster
  1981   – Janice Lynn Mather, Bahamian-Canadian author
  1981   – Anna Woltz, Dutch author\
1982 – Alison Brie, American actress
  1982   – Julia Wertz, American cartoonist, writer and urban explorer
1984 – Branden Jacobs-Jenkins, American playwright
1985 – Alexa Ray Joel, American singer-songwriter
1988 – Eric Berry, American football player
  1988   – Christen Press, American footballer
  1988   – Ágnes Szávay, Hungarian tennis player
1989 – Jane Levy, American actress
  1989   – Kei Nishikori, Japanese tennis player
1991 – Steven Caulker, English footballer
1993 – Gabby May, Canadian artistic gymnast
1995 – Myles Garrett, American football player
  1995   – Ross Lynch, American singer and actor
1996 – Sana Minatozaki, Japanese singer
  1996   – Dylan Minnette, American actor, musician and singer
1998 – Seamus Davey-Fitzpatrick, American actor
2000 – Julio Rodríguez, Dominican baseball player

Deaths

Pre-1600
1170 – Thomas Becket, English archbishop and saint (b. 1118)
1208 – Emperor Zhangzong of Jin, (b. 1168)
1380 – Elizabeth of Poland, queen consort of Hungary (b. 1305)
1550 – Bhuvanaikabahu VII, King of Kotte (b. 1468)
1563 – Sebastian Castellio, French preacher and theologian (b. 1515)

1601–1900
1606 – Stephen Bocskai, Prince of Transylvania (b. 1557)
1661 – Antoine Girard de Saint-Amant, French poet (b. 1594)
1689 – Thomas Sydenham, English physician and author (b. 1624)
1720 – Maria Margaretha Kirch, German astronomer and educator (b. 1670)
1731 – Brook Taylor, English mathematician and theorist (b. 1685)
1785 – Johann Heinrich Rolle, German composer (b. 1716)
  1785   – Johan Herman Wessel, Norwegian-Danish poet and playwright (b. 1742)
1807 – Diogo de Carvalho e Sampayo, Portuguese diplomat and scientist (b. 1750)
1825 – Jacques-Louis David, French painter and illustrator (b. 1748)
1890 – Spotted Elk, American tribal leader (b. 1826)
  1890   – Octave Feuillet, French novelist and dramatist (b. 1821)
1891 – Leopold Kronecker, Polish-German mathematician and academic (b. 1823)
1894 – Christina Rossetti, English poet and hymn-writer (b. 1830)
1897 – William James Linton, English-American painter, author, and activist (b. 1812)
1900 – John Henry Leech, English entomologist (b. 1862)

1901–present
1905 – Charles Yerkes, American financier (b. 1837)
1910 – Samuel Butcher, Anglo-Irish classical scholar and politician (b. 1850)
  1910   – Reginald Doherty, English tennis player (b. 1872)
1911 – Rosamund Marriott Watson, English poet, author and critic (b. 1860)
1918 – Abby Leach, American educator (b. 1855)
1919 – William Osler, Canadian physician and professor (b. 1849)
1921 – Hermann Paul, German philologist, linguist and lexicographer (b. 1846)
1924 – Carl Spitteler, Swiss poet and academic, Nobel Prize laureate (b. 1845)
1925 – Félix Vallotton, Swiss-French painter (b. 1865)
1926 – Rainer Maria Rilke, Austrian poet and author (b. 1875)
1929 – Wilhelm Maybach, German engineer and businessman, founded Maybach (b. 1846)
  1929   – Edward Christopher Williams, American librarian (b. 1871)
1937 – Don Marquis, American journalist, author, and playwright (b. 1878)
1939 – Kelly Miller, American mathematician, sociologist, essayist, newspaper columnist and author (b. 1863)
  1939   – Madeleine Pelletier, French psychiatrist, feminist and political activist (b. 1874)
1940 – Stephen Birch, American businessman (b. 1873)
1941 – Louis Eilshemius, American painter (b. 1864)
  1941   – Tullio Levi-Civita, Italian mathematician and scholar (b. 1873)
1943 – Art Young, American cartoonist and writer (b. 1866)
1944 – Khasan Israilov, Chechen rebel (b. 1910)
1945 – Beulah Dark Cloud, American actress (b. 1887)
1946 – Camillo Schumann, German composer and organist (b. 1872)
1948 – Harry Farjeon, British composer and music teacher (b. 1878)
1949 – Tyler Dennett, American historian and author (b. 1883)
1952 – Fletcher Henderson, American pianist, composer, and bandleader (b. 1897)
  1952   – Beryl Rubinstein, American pianist, composer and teacher (b. 1898)
1954 – William Merriam Burton, American chemist (b. 1865)
1956 – Miles Vandahurst Lynk, American physician and author (b. 1871)
1958 – Doris Humphrey, American dancer and choreographer (b. 1895)
1959 – Robin Milford, English soldier and composer (b. 1903)
1960 – Eden Phillpotts, English author and poet (b. 1862)
1965 – Frank Nugent, American screenwriter, journalist and film reviewer (b. 1908)
  1965   – Kōsaku Yamada, Japanese composer and conductor (b. 1886)
1967 – Paul Whiteman, American violinist, composer, and conductor (b. 1890)
1968 – Austin Farrer, English theologian and philosopher (b. 1904)
1970 – William King Gregory, American zoologist and anatomist (b. 1876)
  1970   – Marie Menken, American director and painter (b. 1909)
1971 – John Marshall Harlan II, American lawyer and jurist (b. 1899)
1972 – Joseph Cornell, American sculptor and director (b. 1903)
1975 – Euell Gibbons, American author and naturalist (b. 1911)
1976 – Ivo Van Damme, Belgian runner (b. 1954)
1979 – F. Edward Hébert, American journalist and politician (b. 1901)
  1979   – Richard Tecwyn Williams, Welsh biochemist (b. 1909)
1980 – Nadezhda Mandelstam, Russian author and educator (b. 1899)
  1980   – Irvin F. Westheimer, American businessman and social reformer (b. 1879)
1981 – Philip Handler, American nutritionist, and biochemist (b. 1917)
  1981   – Miroslav Krleža, Croatian author, poet, and playwright (b. 1893)
1984 – P. H. Polk, American photographer (b. 1898)
  1984   – Leo Robin, American composer, lyricist and songwriter (b. 1900)
1986 – Harold Macmillan, English captain and politician, Prime Minister of the United Kingdom (b. 1894)
  1986   – Andrei Tarkovsky, Russian director and screenwriter (b. 1932)
1987 – Jun Ishikawa, Japanese author (b. 1899)
  1987   – Wilbert E. Moore, American sociologist (b. 1914)
1988 – Mike Beuttler, Egyptian race car driver (b. 1940)
  1988   – Ieuan Maddock, Welsh scientist and nuclear researcher (b. 1917)
1992 – Vivienne Segal, American actress and singer (b. 1897)
1994 – Frank Thring, Australian actor (b. 1926)
1995 – Hans Henkemans, Dutch pianist, composer and psychiatrist (b. 1913)
1996 – Pennar Davies, Welsh clergyman and author (b. 1911)
  1996   – Mireille Hartuch, French singer-songwriter and actress (b. 1906)
  1996   – Peggy Herbison, Scottish politician (b. 1907)
1998 – Ralph Siu, American scholar, military and civil servant, and author (b. 1917)
  1998   – Don Taylor, American actor and film director (b. 1920)
1999 – Leon Radzinowicz, Polish-English criminologist and academic (b. 1906)
2001 – Takashi Asahina, Japanese conductor (b. 1908)
  2001   – György Kepes, Hungarian painter, photographer, designer, educator and art theorist (b. 1906)
2002 – Lloyd Barbee, American lawyer and politician (b. 1925)
2003 – Dinsdale Landen, English actor (b. 1932)
  2003   – Bob Monkhouse, English comedian, actor, and game show host (b. 1928)
2004 – Julius Axelrod, American biochemist and academic, Nobel Prize laureate (b. 1912)
  2004   – Peter Davison, American poet, essayist, teacher, lecturer, editor and publisher (b. 1928)
2005 – Cyril Philips, British historian and academic director (b. 1912)
  2005   – Basil William Robinson, British art scholar and author (b. 1912)
2007 – Phil O'Donnell, Scottish footballer (b. 1972)
  2007   – Phil Dusenberry, American advertising executive (b. 1936)
2008 – Freddie Hubbard, American trumpet player and composer (b. 1938)
  2008   – Victor H. Krulak, American soldier (b. 1913)
2009 – Janina Bauman, Polish journalist and writer (b. 1926)
  2009   – David Levine, American artist and illustrator (b. 1926)
2010 – Avi Cohen, Israeli footballer and manager (b. 1956)
  2010   – Bill Erwin, American actor and cartoonist (b. 1914)
2011 – Constance Bartlett Hieatt, American scholar (b. 1928)
2012 – Tony Greig, South African-Australian cricketer and sportscaster (b. 1946)
  2012   – William Rees-Mogg, British newspaper journalist (b. 1928)
2013 – C. T. Hsia, Chinese-American critic and scholar (b. 1921)
  2013   – Benjamin Curtis, American guitarist, drummer, and songwriter (b. 1978)
  2013   – Connie Dierking, American basketball player (b. 1936)
  2013   – Wojciech Kilar, Polish classical and film music composer (b. 1932)
2014 – Hari Harilela, Indian-Hong Kong businessman and philanthropist (b. 1922)
  2014   – Juanito Remulla, Sr., Filipino lawyer and politician, Governor of Cavite (b. 1933)
2015 – Om Prakash Malhotra, Indian general and politician, 25th Governor of Punjab (b. 1922)
  2015   – Pavel Srníček, Czech footballer and coach (b. 1968)
2016 – Keion Carpenter, American football defensive back (b. 1977)
  2016   – LaVell Edwards, American football head coach (b. 1930)
2017 – Peggy Cummins, Irish actress (b. 1925)
  2017   – John C. Portman Jr., American neofuturistic architect and real estate developer  (b. 1924)
2018 – Brian Garfield, American novelist, historian and screenwriter (b. 1939)
  2018   – Rosenda Monteros, Mexican actress (b. 1935)
2019 – Alasdair Gray, Scottish writer and artist (b. 1934)
  2019   – Neil Innes, English writer, comedian and musician (b. 1944)
2020 – Pierre Cardin, Italian-French fashion designer (b. 1922)
  2020   – Joe Louis Clark, American educator (b. 1937)
2021 – Peter Klatzow, South African composer (b. 1945)
2022 – Pelé, Brazilian footballer (b. 1940)
  2022   – Edgar Savisaar, Estonian politician, Estonian Minister of the Interior (b. 1950)
  2022   – Vivienne Westwood, English fashion designer (b. 1941)

Holidays and observances
 Christian feast day:
 Ebrulf
 Jonathan, Prince of Israel and David's friend.
 Thomas Becket
 Trophimus of Arles
 December 29 (Eastern Orthodox liturgics)
 Constitution Day (Ireland)
 Independence Day (Mongolia)
 The fifth day of Christmas (Western Christianity)
 The fourth day of Kwanzaa (United States)

References

External links

 BBC: On This Day
 
 Historical Events on December 29

Days of the year
December